The Brazil women's national cricket team represents the country of Brazil in women's cricket matches.

History
In April 2018, the International Cricket Council (ICC) granted full Women's Twenty20 International (WT20I) status to all its members. Therefore, all Twenty20 matches played between Brazil women and another international side since 1 July 2018 have been full WT20I matches.

Brazil's first WT20I matches were contested as part of the South American Women's Championships in August 2018 against Chile, Mexico and Peru (although Peru's matches were not classified as WT20Is as not all of their players met the ICC residency requirements). Brazil won all group stage matches and won in the final against Chile by a margin of 92 runs.

In January 2020, Cricket Brazil awarded central contracts to fourteen of its players.

In December 2020, the ICC announced the qualification pathway for the 2023 ICC Women's T20 World Cup. Brazil were named in the 2021 ICC Women's T20 World Cup Americas Qualifier regional group, alongside three other teams. In that qualifier, Brazil finished second, and also achieved a miraculous one-run win over Canada, by taking five wickets in the last five consecutive deliveries of the two teams' second T20I match against each other.

Brazil was invited to the 2022 Kwibuka Women's T20 Tournament in Rwanda, along with Germany becoming one of the first two non-African teams to participate in the tournament. Brazil recorded wins over Germany and Botswana in the round-robin stage of the tournament, before losing to Nigeria in the fifth-place play-off.

Tournament history

ICC Women's T20 World Cup Americas Qualifier
 2019: Did not participate
 2021: 2nd (DNQ)

South American Cricket Championship
 2018: Winner
 2019: Winner

Records and statistics

International Match Summary — Brazil Women
 
Last updated 15 October 2022

Twenty20 International

 Highest team total: 235/2 v. Peru on 13 October 2022 at Sao Fernando Polo and Cricket Club, Itaguaí.
 Highest individual score: 77, Roberta Moretti Avery v. Peru on 13 October 2022 at Sao Fernando Polo and Cricket Club, Itaguaí
 Best individual bowling figures: 4/6, Nicole Cervone Monteiro v. Canada on 21 October 2021 at Reforma Athletic Club, Naucalpan.

T20I record versus other nations

Records complete to WT20I #1280. Last updated 15 October 2022.

See also
 Brazil national cricket team
 List of Brazil women Twenty20 International cricketers

References

External links
 

 
Women's
Cricket
Women's national cricket teams